SCUD is an Indian film production and distribution company established and owned by Satarupa Sanyal in 1998. In the same year, the independent film maker produced and directed her debut film ANU (Bengali / feature / 35mm / 12reels). The success and widespread recognition of the ANU, nationally and overseas, laid the foundation of the company.

Till date SCUD has produced more than 50 short films, 4 feature films, TVC, Music videos, telefilms, documentaries and awareness films.

From 2017 onwards, Ritabhari Chakraborty has been heading the company alongside of her mother Satarupa Sanyal. The former has taken charge of national advertisements and other motion picture projects.

The mother-daughter duo also runs an NGO together namely "Scud society for Social Communication" and they prefer to focus on the development of women especially in the rural areas in West Bengal.

Filmography

Films

Short films

Music videos

Advertisements

References

Film production companies based in Kolkata
Indian film distributors
1998 establishments in West Bengal
Indian companies established in 1998
Mass media companies established in 1998